Elizabeth Berg (born December 2, 1948) is an American novelist.

Berg was born in Saint Paul, Minnesota, USA, and lived in Boston prior to her residence in Chicago. She studied English and Humanities at the University of Minnesota, but later ended up with a nursing degree  . Her writing career started when she won an essay contest in Parents magazine. Since her debut novel in 1993, her novels have sold in large numbers and have received several awards and nominations, even though some critics have tagged them as sentimental. She won the New England Book Awards in 1997.

The three novels Durable Goods, Joy School, and True to Form form a trilogy about the 12-year-old Katie Nash, in part based on the author's own experience as a daughter in a military family. Most recently, her essay "The Pretend Knitter" appears in the anthology Knitting Yarns: Writers on Knitting, published by W. W. Norton & Company in November 2013.

Bibliography 
Family traditions: celebrations for holidays and everyday (1992), illustrations by Robert Roth
Durable Goods (1993), selected as ALA Best Books of the Year
Talk Before Sleep (1994), highlighting the fight against breast cancer
Range of Motion (1995)
The Pull of the Moon (1996)
Joy School (1997), selected among the ALA 1998 Best Books for Young Adults
What We Keep (1998)
Escaping into the Open: The Art of Writing True (1999), non-fiction
Until the Real Thing Comes Along (1999), about a woman's love for a gay man
Open House (2000), Oprah's Book Club selection
Never Change (2001)
Ordinary Life: stories (2002)
True to Form (2002)
Say When (2003)
The Art of Mending (2004)
The Year of Pleasures (2005)
The Handmaid and the Carpenter (2006)
We Are All Welcome Here (2006)
Dream When You're Feeling Blue (2007)
The Day I Ate Whatever I Wanted (2008)
Home Safe (2009)
The Last Time I Saw You (2010)
Once Upon a Time, There Was You (2011)
Tapestry of Fortunes (2013)
The Dream Lover (2015)
Make Someone Happy: Favorite Postings (2016)
The Story of Arthur Truluv (2017)
Night of Miracles (2018)
The Confession Club (2019)
I'll Be Seeing You: a Memoir (2020)

References

External links

Author presentation by publisher Random House, Inc.
Meet the Writers from Barnes & Noble

1948 births
Living people
20th-century American novelists
21st-century American novelists
American women novelists
University of Minnesota School of Nursing alumni
Writers from Chicago
20th-century American women writers
21st-century American women writers
Novelists from Illinois